John Cheruiyot Korir (born 13 December 1981) is a Kenyan athlete who specializes in long-distance running.  He is known to be an athlete who often shines at trials but fails to win big competitions.

Career
He was born in Kiramwok, Bomet District.  He began running in 1994, while still at primary school.  He graduated from the Merigi Secondary School in 1998. He enlisted in the Kenyan Army in 2001.  He is a member of the Kipsigis people, a Kalenjin sub-tribe.

John Cheruiyot Korir is not to be confused with John Kipsang Korir, who mainly competes in U.S. races.  The two have competed against each other couple of times.  At the 2002 Lisbon Half Marathon, Kipsang Korir was better, while Cheruiyot Korir beat his namesake at a cross country event in Kenya in 2003.  At the 2005 Cherry Blossom 10-Mile Run, John Cheruiyot Korir was fifth in an event won by John Kipsang Korir.

His manager is Gianni Demadonna. He is coached by Renato Canova.

International competitions

Personal bests 
Track
3000 metres: 7:43.35 (2000)
5000 metres: 13:09.58 (2000)
10,000 metres: 26:52.87 (2002)
Road
10K run: 27:49 (2005)
15 kilometres: 43:26 (2003)
Half marathon: 1:00:47 (2004)

References

External links 

IAAF: Focus on athletes

1981 births
Living people
Kenyan male long-distance runners
Olympic athletes of Kenya
Athletes (track and field) at the 2000 Summer Olympics
Athletes (track and field) at the 2004 Summer Olympics
Commonwealth Games competitors for Kenya
Athletes (track and field) at the 2002 Commonwealth Games
World Athletics Championships athletes for Kenya
People from Bomet County
Kenyan male cross country runners